The Sierra Forest Reserve was a federal reserve in the Sierra Nevada, in eastern California. It was established on February 14, 1893 by President Benjamin Harrison with authorization from section 24 of the Forest Reserve Act of 1891. The first was the San Gabriel Timberland Reserve.

Initiation
The Sierra Reserve beginnings, like the San Gabriel Reserve, were by petitions sent to the US Congress from Tulare County officials wanting to stop the damage in the Sierra Nevada by timber and livestock commercial interests.

The General Land Office which was responsible for management of public lands, sent Benjamin Allen to investigate and report back, which he did, recommending a set aside of land called Tulare Reserve. He originally had five million acres (20,000 km²) to six million acres (24,000 km²) for this reserve in his report.

Support
The majority of local citizens were supportive, any protests heard were coming from the sheepmen. Conservationist and later Venice, California founder Abbot Kinney and Century magazine editor Robert Underwood Johnson gave their support of the proposed set aside.

Establishment
Benjamin Allen, in his final report, reduced the size and changed the name to Sierra Forest Reserve. The new reserve bordered most of Yosemite National Park with its western boundary almost surrounding General Grant and Sequoia national parks.  Its lands are now primarily part of the Sierra National Forest.

Footnotes

References
Godfrey, Anthony The Ever-Changing View-A History of the National Forests in California USDA Forest Service Publishers, 2005

See also
Sierra National Forest
Sequoia National Forest
Inyo National Forest

Former National Forests of California
History of the Sierra Nevada (United States)
Sierra National Forest
Defunct forest reserves of the United States